A hierarchy is an arrangement of units into related levels of different weights or ranks, meaning that levels are considered "higher" or "lower" than one another. The term, which originally meant rule by priests, is now generalised and describes systems with a linear concept of subordinates and superiors and where each level has only 1 direct parent level. Hierarchies are typically depicted as a tree structures.

Hierarchy may also refer to:
 Hierarchy (mathematics), the mathematical model of a hierarchical structure as an ordered set
 Containment hierarchy, a hierarchy of only strictly nested sets
 Hierarchy (object-oriented programming), also known as inheritance, the creation of new classes from existing classes
 Hierarchical database model, a tree-like database model
 Hierarchical query, an SQL query on a hierarchical database
 Hierarchical linear modeling, multi-level statistical analysis and linear regression
 Hierarchical organization, the structure of most organizations, including governments, businesses and organized religions
 Catholic Church hierarchy
 Hierarchical network, the hierarchical of computer network components
 Hierarchical control system, a layered model for component organization in software and robotics
 Dominance hierarchy, an intraspecific ordering of individuals or groups by power status and dominance
 Social hierarchy, the concept as applied to humans
 Memory hierarchy, the hierarchical organization of computer storage for analysis of performance issues
 Hierarchy of life, the biological organisation of all life from the atomic level to the biosphere
 Hierarchy of genres, any formalization that ranks different types of art genres in an art-form in terms of their value
 Hierarchy of values, an ordered list of social values in US law
Hierarchy of needs
 Hierarchy, an alien race in the Universe at War video game series

See also
 Tree structure